Scopula subtilata is a moth of the  family Geometridae. It is found in southern Russia and Ukraine.

References

Moths described in 1867
subtilata
Moths of Europe
Moths of Asia